Amongst the Iranian languages, the phonology of Pashto is of middle complexity, but its morphology is very complex.

Consonants

 Voiceless stops and affricates  are all unaspirated; they have slightly aspirated allophones prevocalically in a stressed syllable, almost like English.
 /, / are heard as palatal fricatives [, ]  in the Northwestern dialect.
  is voiced back-alveolar retroflex flap  and voiced alveolar approximant  at the end of a syllable.

Dialects 

The retroflex variants  are used in the Southwest dialects whereas the post-alveolar variants   are used in Southeast Dialects. The palatal variants  are used in the Wardak and Central Ghilji dialects. In the North Eastern dialects  and  merge  with the velar .

Phonotactics

Pashto syllable structure can be summarized as follows; parentheses enclose optional components:
 (C1 C2 (C3)) (S1) V (S2) (C4 (C5))

Pashto syllable structure consists of an optional syllable onset, consisting of one or two consonants; an obligatory syllable nucleus, consisting of a vowel optionally preceded by and/or followed by a semivowel; and an optional syllable coda, consisting of one or two consonants.  The following restrictions apply:

 Onset
 First consonant (C1): Can be any consonant, including a liquid.
Second consonant (C2): Can be any consonant.
 Third consonant (C3 ): Can be any consonant. (see #Consonant Clusters below)
 Nucleus
 Semivowel (S1)
 Vowel (V)
 Semivowel (S2)
 Coda
 First consonant (C4): Can be any consonant
 Second consonant (C5): Can be any consonant

Consonant clusters
Pashto also has a liking for word-initial consonant clusters in all dialects; some hundred such clusters occurs. However consonant gemination is unknown to Pashto.

Examples 
An edited list from the book Pashto Phonology by M.K. Khan:

Vowels
Most dialects in Pashto have seven vowels and seven diphthongs.

 Tegey & Robson (1996) also include near-close vowels // and //.

Diphthongs

Elfenbein notes  that  the long diphthongs [, ] are always stressed, whilst the short diphthongs may or may not be stressed.

Orthography of diphthongs

Stress 
Pashto has phonemic variable stress, unique amongst Iranian languages.

For instance, in verbs to distinguish aspect:

Basic Word Stress 
Stress is indicated by the IPA stress marker [ˈ].

In general, the last syllable is stressed if the word ends in a consonant and the penultimate syllable is stressed if the last syllable ends in a vowel.
!

Masculine Words ending in "ə" 
These have final stress generally.

Feminine Words ending in "o" 
These end in a stress /o/.

Wordings ending in Aleph 
Words ending in IPA /ɑ/ i.e. ا  are stressed in the last syllable.

Exceptions 
Word meanings also change upon stress.

Intonation

Questions 
WH-Questions [who, where, when etc] follow a hat pattern of intonation: a rise in pitch followed by a fall  in pitch.

 تاسو چېرته کار کوئ
 [ tā́so ↗čérta kār kawə́ɪ↘ ]

Yes/No-Questions end in a high intonation: a rise in pitch.

 غنم يې ورېبل  ؟
 [ ğanə́m ye wә́rebəl↗ ]

Contrastive Focus 
When a word is contrasted with another word it carries a low then high pitch accent, followed by a sharp fall in pitch accent.

 نه له د نه کشر يم
 [ na↘ lə ↗də nə kə́shər yə́m↘ ]

Dialectal phonology

Consonants 
This diagram is based on Anna Boyle's division of the dialect variations  on geographic regions:

Regional Variation
This diagram however does not factor in the regional variations within the broad geographic areas. Compare the following consonant and vowel differences amongst regions categorised as Northern dialects:

Or the difference in vowels  and diphthongs in North Eastern Pashto:

Alveolo-palatal fricative 
Rozi Khan Burki claims that the Ormuri alveolo-palatal fricative // and // may also be present in Waziri. But Pashto linguists such as Josef Elfenbein, Anna Boyle or Yousaf Khan Jazab have not noted this in Waziri Phonology.

Vowels

Waziri vowels

The Vowel Shift 
Corey Miller notes that the shift does not affect all words.

In Waziri dialect the stressed   in standard Pashto  becomes . 

When   in begins a word in standard Pashto can become   or [w]

Elfenbein also notes the presence  of the near-open vowel [æ].

Apridi vowels

Apridi has the additional  close-mid central rounded vowel  /ɵ/.

Diphthongs in dialects
The diphthongs varies according to dialect.

Yousaf Khan Jazab notes that the diphthong //  becomes  // in the Khattak Dialect in the verbal suffix /ئ/, but it remains as the diphthong // in the nominal/adjectival /ۍ/ example: مړۍ /ma.ˈɽəɪ/ "bread".

Nasalisation of vowels 

As  noted by Yousaf Khan Jazab,  the Marwat dialect and the Bansiwola dialect have nasalised vowels also. It is also noted in the Waṇetsi/Tarin dialect.

These are indicated by the diactric mark /  ̃ /.

Notes

References

Bibliography

 
 
 
 
 
 

Pashto
Iranian phonologies